Shane Keisuke Berkery (born 9 April 1992) is an Irish-Japanese contemporary artist based in Dublin, Ireland. His cultural background has been a major influence on his work and is a frequent theme in his paintings. Berkery primarily works out of his studio in Dublin.

Life and career 
Berkery experienced controversy in 2015 when he submitted a nude of the college director for the graduation exhibition at National College of Art and Design in protest of how the college was being run. The painting was later withdrawn.

In 2013, singer Sinead O' Connor commissioned Berkery to paint a mural of Hindu god Vishnu in her home in Bray, Ireland. O' Connor originally planned to use Berkery's image for the cover of her album in summer 2014, titled The Vishnu Room but the album was later retitled, without reference to Vishnu.

Exhibitions 
Solo exhibition 'Cave Paintings' at Molesworth Gallery, Dublin, Ireland - June 2021
Solo Exhibition 'Figures' at Contra Galleries, New York, USA - September 2019
Painting the Figure Now II show at Wausau Museum of Contemporary Art, Wisconsin, USA - July, 2019
Solo presentation at Start Art Fair, Saatchi Gallery, London, United Kingdom - September 2018
Lennox Street Grand Opening Exhibition at Hangtough Gallery, Dublin, Ireland - September 2018
Collaboration with fashion designer Helen Cody - September 2017
Solo Exhibition 'The Shane Berkery Show' at The Chimera Gallery, Mullingar, Ireland - May 2017
RHA 187th Annual Exhibition at Royal Hibernian Academy, Dublin, Ireland - May 2017
Edinburgh Art Fair at Corn Exchange, Edinburgh, Scotland - November 2016 with the @Chimera Gallery.
Joint Exhibition with Ruby Wallis "For each it is different and the same"  at Artist-Run Gallery, Galway, Ireland - August 2016
Portraits of a Nation, Irish State Art Collection at Farmleigh Gallery, Dublin, Ireland - April 2016
"Perennial" Group Show at the Fumbally Exchange Gallery. Dublin, Ireland - March 2016
"Contemporary Art at Christmas"  at Mason Hayes & Curran Law Firm, Dublin, Ireland - December 2015
Emerging Artists Exhibition at St. Patrick's University Hospital. Dublin, Ireland - September 2015
RDS Craft and Student Art Awards Exhibition at Royal Dublin Society Concert Hall, Dublin, Ireland - August 2015
NCAD Degree Show at National College of Art and Design, Dublin, Ireland - June 2015
Solo Exhibition "The Shane Berkery Experience" at Hendrons Collider, Dublin, Ireland - September 2014

Recognition and awards 
Shortlisted for 2019 Zurich Portrait Award, National Gallery of Ireland - September 2019
Named in "Five of the best art exhibitions to see" in The Irish Times - March 2018
Shortlisted for 2017 Hennessy Portrait Award, National Gallery of Ireland - September 2017
Painting of US President Donald Trump appeared in The Irish Times and Irish Independent newspapers - January 2017
Named in the "10 Irish painters under 30 to watch" by RTÉ Culture - January 2017
Winner of the Whyte's Award at the Royal Hibernian Academy annual exhibition - March 2016
Winner of the Hennessy Craig Award at the RHA annual exhibition - April 2016
Painting purchased by the Office of Public Works (OPW) and placed in the Irish State Art Collection - February 2016
National University of Ireland (NUI) Art and Design Prize - November 2015

References

External links 
Artist's website

Living people
1992 births
Irish people of Japanese descent
Irish painters
Japanese painters
Japanese people of Irish descent
Japanese emigrants to Ireland
Contemporary painters
Artists from Tokyo
Artists from Dublin (city)
People educated at St Andrew's College, Dublin
Alumni of the National College of Art and Design
Irish contemporary artists